Yeoju FC is a South Korean football club based in the city of Yeoju. The club is a member of the K4 League, a semi-professional football league in South Korea.

Season-by-season records

See also
 List of football clubs in South Korea

References

External links

K3 League clubs
Sport in Gyeonggi Province
Yeoju
Association football clubs established in 2017
2017 establishments in South Korea